The Mapungubwe Collection curated by at the University of Gauteng Museums comprises archaeological material excavated by the University of Gauteng at the Mapungubwe archaeological site since its discovery in 1933. The archaeological collection comprises ceramics, metals, trade glass beads, indigenous beads, clay figurines, and bone and ivory artefacts as well as an extensive research collection of potsherds, faunal remains and other fragmentary material. The University of Gauteng established a permanent museum in June 2000, thereby making the archaeological collection more widely available for public access and interest beyond the confines of academia. The collection is kept on site for tourism purposes.

The archaeological site of Mapungubwe
The archaeological site of Mapungubwe [pronounced: Mah-POON-goob-weh], is located on the borders of Zimbabwe and Botswana in the Limpopo Province, and is situated near the confluence of the Shashe and Limpopo Rivers in southern Africa.  It is here along these major rivers that the rise of complex Iron Age societies first began at the site of Schroda, a Zhizo/Leokwe community (AD 900 - AD 1000). Thereafter, a shift in regional economic and socio-political changes gave rise to the new nearby settlement of K2 (AD 1030–AD 1220). A ruling class emerged and thus the first southern African state came into being at Mapungubwe Hill (AD 1220 - AD 1290). These sites collectively form the core area of a World Heritage Site, recognised for both its natural and cultural landscape that are considered to be of outstanding universal value.

The discovery in 1932 was first attributed to the van Graan family. Mapungubwe Hill however had already been discovered in the early 1890s by an explorer named François Lotrie. Local knowledge of Mapungubwe has also been recorded from oral histories, thus supporting ethnographic and historical evidence about the awareness of Mapungubwe as a sacred hill. Evidence suggests that Mapungubwe therefore cannot be regarded as belonging to any single individual, but is rather symbolically associated with various groups of people. The combination of archaeological research, historical records and oral traditions does nonetheless expand the understanding of pre-colonial societies and their settlement in and around Mapungubwe over periods of time.

The collection

The discovery of gold artefacts on Mapungubwe Hill in 1932 served as a catalyst for detailed academic research early in 1933 after the University of Pretoria had secured research rights from the government. Large-scale excavations were undertaken between 1933 and 1940, until research was disrupted by the outbreak of World War II. Intermittent excavations followed in the 1950s, which were then continued by more thorough stratigraphic excavations throughout 1960s up to the late 1990s. Over decades, these excavations and scientific findings were largely held within academia and rarely reached public knowledge. The collection was assembled over 80 years of excavations by the University of Pretoria, although minor collections of Mapungubwe material are housed at several other institutions throughout South Africa. In 2003, with the declaration of Mapungubwe by UNESCO as a World Heritage Site, a suspension was placed on all excavations at Mapungubwe, a decision which is still in place as of 2016.

The Mapungubwe Collection is on public display at both the University of Pretoria Museums as well as the Mapungubwe Gold Collection new Javett-UP Arts Centre which opened its doors on 24 September 2019. Part of the Mapungubwe Collection is loaned to the Mapungubwe Interpretation Center at Mapungubwe National Park.

See also

 Kingdom of Mapungubwe
 Mapungubwe National Park

References 

 
 
 The Mapungubwe Institute for Strategic Reflection (MISTRA) 2012. Mapungubwe Reconsidered: Exploring beyond the rise and decline of the Mapungubwe state) Mapungubwe Research Report

External links 
 SA National Parks
 Pretoria University collection

History museums in South Africa
Archaeological museums in South Africa
Museums in Pretoria
University of Pretoria museums